Kiss Chronicles: 3 Classic Albums is a repackaging of the first three studio albums by the hard rock band Kiss. It is essentially identical to The Originals collection, which was released in 1976, except in CD format and with different packaging.

Track listing

References
KISS CHRONICLES: 3 CLASSIC ALBUMS (** BOX SET)

Kiss (band) compilation albums
2005 compilation albums